Erez Petrank is a computer scientist whose notable research contributions are in the fields of programming languages and computer systems (mostly on memory management), cryptography (mostly on theoretical foundations), computational complexity, and parallel computing. Petrank is currently (2017) a professor at the computer science department at the Technion - Israel Institute of Technology.

Petrank has published more than seventy papers in top conferences and journals with more than 5000  citations and an h-index of 38 (computed by Google Scholar). 
He has served as the program chair of the International Symposium on Memory Management and of the ACM SIGPLAN/SIGOPS International Conference on Virtual Execution Environments (VEE). From 2009 to 2012, Petrank served on the Association for Computing Machinery SIGPLAN Executive Committee.

References

Living people
Israeli computer scientists
Academic staff of Technion – Israel Institute of Technology
Year of birth missing (living people)